Muriel Evelyn Grossfeld (née Davis; October 7, 1940 – January 17, 2021) was an American gymnast who won a team gold medal at the 1963 Pan American Games. She competed in all artistic gymnastics events at the 1956, 1960 and 1964 Olympics and finished ninth with the American team four times: all-around in all three games and in the team portable apparatus in 1956. Her best individual result was 19th place in the floor exercise in 1960.

Grossfeld was married to the fellow Olympic gymnast Abie Grossfeld, but they later divorced. After retiring from competitions she had a long career as a national gymnastics coach and international referee. In 1981 she was inducted into the U.S. Gymnastics Hall of Fame.

She appeared on the TV program "To Tell The Truth" on March 15, 1965.

References

External links
 USA Gymnastics Hall of Fame biographical treatment
 Davis-Grossfeld on To Tell the Truth

1940 births
2021 deaths
Sportspeople from New York City
Gymnasts at the 1956 Summer Olympics
Gymnasts at the 1960 Summer Olympics
Gymnasts at the 1964 Summer Olympics
Olympic gymnasts of the United States
American female artistic gymnasts
Pan American Games gold medalists for the United States
Pan American Games medalists in gymnastics
Gymnasts at the 1963 Pan American Games
Medalists at the 1963 Pan American Games
21st-century American women